The 1997–98 season was Port Vale's 86th season of football in the English Football League, and fourth successive season in the First Division. John Rudge managed to mastermind a final day escape from relegation, as rivals Stoke City instead lost their second tier status, leaving Vale as the top club in the Potteries. In the FA Cup, Vale took Arsenal to a replay, before leaving at the Third Round stage having lost on penalties. In the League Cup Vale again exited at the First Round. Something of an end of an era for the club, Lee Mills and Jon McCarthy left the club on big money moves, whilst Dean Glover, Andy Porter, and Andy Hill also left the club. The club made its record signing however, in bringing Gareth Ainsworth in from Lincoln City for £500,000.

Overview

First Division
The pre-season saw the arrival of Swedish midfielder Jan Jansson from IFK Norrköping for a £200,000 fee. Dutch defender Mark Snijders also signed from AZ.

The Vale started the season in modest form, as they picked up fourteen points in the opening nine games. On 11 September, John Rudge made the club's record signing by paying Lincoln City £500,000 for the services of midfielder Gareth Ainsworth. To pay for this Jon McCarthy was sold to Birmingham City for £1.5m. Also heading away from Stoke-on-Trent was Arjan van Heusden, who joined Oxford United on loan. The next month Gareth Griffiths left for a loan spell at Shrewsbury Town. Disappointment came on 12 October, with a 2–1 defeat to rivals Stoke City at the newly opened Britannia Stadium. Vale's indifferent form continued, one highlight being a 3–2 win over Manchester City at Maine Road on 4 November. Later in the year Paul Beesley joined on loan from Man City, and played a handful of games. The club's indifferent form then turned to a terrible run of ten defeats in twelve games, which included a run of one goal scored in seven games. Their form picked up in February, though they were still inconsistent. On 1 March, Stoke, who were also in relegation danger, escaped from Vale Park with a goalless draw. Later in month Rudge signed young Tottenham Hotspur forward Paul Mahorn on non-contract terms. On 14 March, a 2–1 win over Manchester City was to prove crucial, though Vale were still in danger of the drop. Going into their final game with Huddersfield Town at the Alfred McAlpine Stadium Vale had lost three straight games, and were in need of a win to ensure their safety in the league. A brace from Jansson, and one each from Martin Foyle and Lee Mills earned Vale a 4–0 win.

They finished in nineteenth place, one point above Manchester City in the relegation zone. Stoke City were also relegated, and had Stoke beat Vale in Burslem then Vale would have taken Stoke's place in the relegation zone. Lee Mills was the club's top-scorer with sixteen goals, whilst Tony Naylor also hit double-figures.

At the end of the season, Lee Mills was signed by Premier League Bradford City, becoming Bradford's first million pound player. Twelve year club veteran Andy Porter signed for Wigan Athletic, as did Griffiths. Another major departure was nine-year club veteran defender Dean Glover, who joined non-league Kidderminster Harriers. Another older player, Andy Hill, retired outright. Other departures were Dave Barnett to Lincoln City, Dean Stokes to Third Division Rochdale, and Dutch keeper Arjan van Heusden also headed into the basement division with Cambridge United. Fellow Dutchman Jermaine Holwyn returned to the Netherlands to play for HFC Haarlem.

Finances
The club's shirt sponsors were Tunstall Assurance.

Cup competitions
In the FA Cup, Vale faced a trip to Highbury to face Arsenal. Rudge's "Valiants" battled to a goalless draw with Arsène Wenger's "Gunners", to take the Londoners back to Burslem. Again goalless, Dennis Bergkamp scored in the tenth minute of extra time, but Wayne Corden equalized eight minutes before the full-time whistle. Lee Dixon missed the first penalty of the shoot-out, but Arsenal recovered to win the game 4–3 on penalties, and later went on to lift the cup.

In the League Cup, Second Division York City eliminated the Vale with a 3–2 aggregate victory.

League table

Results
Port Vale's score comes first

Football League First Division

Results by matchday

Matches

FA Cup

League Cup

Player statistics

Appearances

Top scorers

Transfers

Transfers in

Transfers out

Loans in

Loans out

References
Specific

General
Soccerbase

Port Vale F.C. seasons
Port Vale